Orland Park is a village in Cook County, Illinois, United States, with a small portion in Will County. The village is a suburb of Chicago. Per the 2020 census, Orland Park had a population of 58,703.

Located 25 miles (40 km) southwest of Chicago, Orland Park is close to several interstate highways, with the I-80 east-west coast connector as its southern border. The Metra commuter rail system links it to the Chicago Loop and from there to O'Hare and Midway airports.

History
Orland Park was first settled as "Orland" in 1834, with Henry Taylor being the area's first settler. Other original settlers include Ichabod and William Myrick, Jacob and Bernard Hostert, Thomas Cooper and John Humphrey. The Hostert brothers built log cabins for their families, which became some of the first homes built in Orland Park. In 1879 the railroad was extended to Orland Park, leading way for the towns first train station, "Sedgwick Station." This development took the town from an agrarian society to a commercial hub that provides shipping services to local farms. The village was incorporated on May 31, 1892. A mall named Orland Square Mall opened at the central part of the village in 1976.

Geography

The main bodies of water in Orland are two lakes: Lake Sedgewick and McGinnis Slough.

Communities bordering Orland Park include Homer Glen (in Will County) to the west, Orland Hills and Mokena (also in Will County but Orland Hills is in Cook County) to the south, Tinley Park to the southeast, Oak Forest to the east, and Palos Park and Palos Heights to the north.

Demographics
As of the 2020 census there were 58,703 people, 22,487 households, and 15,952 families residing in the village. The racial makeup of the village was 82.54% White, 3.42% African American, 0.21% Native American, 5.36% Asian, 0.01% Pacific Islander, 2.47% from other races, and 5.98% from two or more races. Hispanic or Latino of any race were 7.94% of the population.

There were 22,487 households, out of which 51.67% had children under the age of 18 living with them, 59.33% were married couples living together, 7.96% had a female householder with no husband present, and 29.06% were non-families. 26.62% of all households were made up of individuals, and 14.34% had someone living alone who was 65 years of age or older. The average household size was 3.15 and the average family size was 2.57.

The village's age distribution consisted of 20.9% under the age of 18, 6.3% from 18 to 24, 21.2% from 25 to 44, 28.8% from 45 to 64, and 23.0% who were 65 years of age or older. The median age was 46.1 years. For every 100 females, there were 98.9 males. For every 100 females age 18 and over, there were 93.9 males.

The median income for a household in the village was $84,676, and the median income for a family was $104,343. Males had a median income of $60,998 versus $41,224 for females. The per capita income for the village was $42,900. About 4.5% of families and 4.9% of the population were below the poverty line, including 4.8% of those under age 18 and 7.2% of those age 65 or over.

Economy
Orland Park's businesses and jobs include finance, retail, services and healthcare. Shopping complexes include Orland Park Crossing and Orland Square Mall.

Orland Park plans to develop a new downtown district, the Orland Park Downtown, previously called the Main Street Triangle, as well as the I-80 Business District.

Top employers
According to Orland Park's 2012 Comprehensive Annual Financial Report, the city's top employers are:

Parks and recreation

Orland Park has a large Recreation and Parks Department. The village has over 60 parks, with plenty of options for recreation, from sports complexes to nature trails.

The Centennial Park Aquatic Center is a  park with a public pool. With six water slides, two large pools, and a children's play area, it is one of the largest public pools in the area. Since its debut in 1992, the Aquatic center has gone through multiple renovations. There have been several add-ons, including two new water slides, and two outdoor sand volleyball courts.

Just south of the Centennial Park Aquatic Center is the  Lake Segdewick. It has hiking paths, nature trails, boardwalks, boat ramps, and pedal boats and kayaks for rent. Fishing is allowed.

The Winter Wonderland Ice Rink is also in Centennial Park. Open from November to March, this outdoor ice rink is free of charge. There is a small warming hut where you can rent ice skates.

The Sportsplex, on 159th Street, is Orland Park's largest indoor recreational facility. It has three full-sized basketball courts, an indoor soccer field, and a full weight room with free weights, plenty of cardio options, and a ¼-mile indoor track. Personal trainers are available, along with fitness classes, including Pilates, yoga, cycling, and Zumba. The Sportsplex also has a  rock wall with six different routes for all skill levels.

The Recreation and Parks Department also helps organize many public events. Centennial Park hosts charity events and seasonal events, including the Orland Park Turkey Trot, a 5K run held on Thanksgiving morning at the John Humphrey Complex. These events are heavily advertised and supported by students of Carl Sandburg High School.

Orland Park is the touted "World's Golf Center".  According to village lore, someone counted 1,089 golf holes within a 15-mile radius of the village, said Jodi Marneris, Orland Park's spokeswoman in 1996.  The "World's Golf Center" concept was then proudly plastered on the village flag and painted on the town's seven water towers.

Government
Orland Park is divided between two Congressional districts, the 1st and the 3rd.

The village maintained an Aa2 bond rating from Moody's and an AA+ rating from Standard and Poor's. These are among the best bond ratings in the Chicago suburbs.(Page 12)

The elected Board of Trustees makes local legislation for the village. The elected officials include the village president (who also serves as mayor), village clerk, and six village trustees, each of whom is elected at large to a four-year term.

Covid-19 pandemic 
Orland Park and its mayor, Keith Pekau, were defiant against state and county mandates during the COVID-19 pandemic. When Illinois Governor J.B. Pritzker ordered a lockdown of businesses and social activities, Pekau led the village in a lawsuit against Pritzker in federal court. Although the court ruled in favor of Pritzker's orders, leading Pekau to drop the lawsuit, Pekau and his fellow village trustees remained opposed to mask mandates. When Cook County passed a mandate requiring restaurants, gyms, and other businesses to verify the vaccination status of customers, the board passed a resolution opposing the mandate and refusing to enforce it in Orland Park.

Education
Orland Park is served by four grammar school districts, Orland School District #135, Community Consolidated School District #146, Palos School District #118 and Kirby School District #140. A majority of Orland Park is within Orland School District #135.

St. Michael School is in Orland Park. A number of other parochial schools in the region provide bus service for Orland Park students.

Orland Park's major high schools are Carl Sandburg High School, Victor J. Andrew High School and Amos Alonzo Stagg High School. CSHS has a little less than 4,000 students. Sandburg has won several Regional, Sectional, and State sports titles over the years. Sandburg's ACT composite score for 2007-08 was 22.7 with SAT scores averaging 635, 644 and 630 for Critical Reading, Math and Writing, respectively.

A number of higher education facilities are in the village. St. Xavier University operates a satellite campus in Orland Park, as did the ITT Technical Institute until its closing in September 2016. Robert Morris University (Illinois) has both an Orland Park campus as well as a second facility in the village, the culinary arts school. Community college education is offered at Moraine Valley Community College, in nearby Palos Hills.

Sixty percent of Orland Park households have someone with at least a bachelor's degree, with a significant number of residents having completed postgraduate work.

Media
Local cable television channel Orland Park TV can be viewed on AT&T UVerse Channel 99 and Comcast Channel 4.

Transportation
Orland Park has three stops on Metra's SouthWest Service, which provides weekday and weekend rail service between Manhattan, Illinois, and Chicago Union Station): 143rd Street, 153rd Street, and 179th Street.

Major highway transportation corridors are:

 southern border of Orland Park
  major north–south thoroughfare
 near the eastern border of Orland Park
 major east-west thoroughfare
 another major north-south thoroughfare
 (167th Street) located entirely in Orland Park.

Notable people 

 Alex Broadhurst, professional hockey player
 John Cangelosi, outfielder for seven Major League Baseball teams
 Connor Carrick, defenseman for the New Jersey Devils
 Pat Fitzgerald, head football coach for Northwestern University
 Buddy Guy, blues singer and guitarist 
 Dan Hampton, defensive end and tackle for Chicago Bears; Super Bowl champion (XX)
 Justin Hartley, actor (Passions, Smallville, This Is Us)
 Sarah Kustok, sports reporter for the YES Network and Fox Sports
 Steve Martinson, right wing for the Detroit Red Wings, Montreal Canadiens, and Minnesota North Stars
 Tim McCarthy, Orland Park police chief; Secret Service agent, took bullet meant for Ronald Reagan during assassination attempt on March 30, 1981
 Mary Therese McDonnell, defender for the Republic of Ireland women's national football team
 Shannon McDonnell, midfielder for the Republic of Ireland women's national football team
 Hemant Mehta, atheist and author (I Sold My Soul on eBay)
 Bill Rancic, winner of The Apprentice season 1
 Ken Rutkowski, syndicated radio talk show host, Business Rockstars
 Michael Schofield, offensive tackle for Los Angeles Chargers and Super Bowl champion Denver Broncos
 Robin Tunney, actress (The Mentalist, The Craft, Vertical Limit, Prison Break)
 Steve Michaels (Steven Szyndrowski), Professional Wrestler most prominently seen on internationally televised Ohio Valley Wrestling.
 Lukas Verzbicas, long-distance runner and triathlete; first runner to win both FLCC and NXN in the same year; alum of Carl Sandburg High School (2011)

See also
Orland Square Mall
Cooper's Hawk Winery & Restaurants

References

External links
 Village of Orland Park official website

 
1892 establishments in Illinois
Chicago metropolitan area
Populated places established in 1892
Villages in Cook County, Illinois
Villages in Illinois
Villages in Will County, Illinois